Say (Saayi) is a town in southwest Niger, situated on the Niger River. It is the capital of the Say Department in the Tillabéri Region. Say was a small Songhai town prior to the arrival of the Fulani marabout Alfa Mohamed Diobo in the 19th Century who converted the town to a center for Islamic learning and established the Emirate of Say. The municipality has 70,234 inhabitants, and its economy is dominated by agriculture, herding and small trade. Today, the inhabitants of Say are mostly Peulh, Songhai and Zarma.

Overview 

The town houses the Islamic University of Niger (Université Islamique de Say), an institute of international scope, whose founding was decided following a meeting of the Organisation of the Islamic Conference in 1974, but that opened only in 1986.  In 1996, it had 400 students, who paid fees much lower than those of the University of Niamey. In Say there is also a forty-year-old College of Secondary Education (Collège d'enseignement secondaire), with nine teachers and 675 students.

History
Say was part of the Songhay Empire, which peaked during the high middle ages. It was here that some of the black horsemen who were crushed by the Almoravid warriors sought refuge at the end of the sixteenth century.

In the 19th Century, Say became an Emirate under the leadership of the Marabout Alfa Mohamed Diobo. The town was occupied by France on 9 May 1897 and administered from Dahomey until 1907. In 1928, it became part of the cercle of Niamey. Located 57 km from Niamey, not far from the W National Park. The town (now an urban commune) has today 70,000 people but bears little resemblance to the ancient center of Islamic learning. In recognition of its former role, however, Niger's first Madrasa (Islamic School) was set up here in 1957, and in 1974 the Organization of the Islamic Conference designated Say as the site for an Islamic university for West Africa, The new university, the Islamic University of Say, opened its doors in October 1986, with Dr. Abdallah Ben Abdel Mohsen At-Turki as its rector. Say is connected to the capital Niamey by an all-weather road and has a colorful Friday market to which many tourists flock.

Mining 
Say is the location of some potential iron ore mines with reserves of about 650MT.

Transport 
An extension of the railway from Benin to Niamey is proposed which would serve the iron ore mines at Say.

Gallery

See also 
 Iron ore in Africa

References

External links 
 

Mining communities in Africa
Mining in Niger
Communes of Tillabéri Region